St John Wall Catholic School is a coeducational secondary school located in the Handsworth area of Birmingham, in the West Midlands of England.

It is a voluntary aided school administered by Birmingham City Council and the Roman Catholic Archdiocese of Birmingham. The school is named after Saint John Wall, a 17th-century Franciscan friar who is honored as a martyr.

St John Wall Catholic School offers GCSEs and BTECs as programmes of study for pupils.

The school used to operate a sixth form offering students a range of A-levels and further BTECs. However the school closed its sixth form provision in 2016.

References

External links
 

Secondary schools in Birmingham, West Midlands
Voluntary aided schools in England
Catholic secondary schools in the Archdiocese of Birmingham